Oliver Kay Eakin, Jr. (August 3, 1917 – February 15, 1993) was an American football player in the National Football League and the All-America Football Conference.

Eakin played college football at the University of Arkansas, and was selected in the first round of the 1940 NFL Draft by the Pittsburgh Steelers.  He played halfback and fullback with the New York Giants in 1941 and 1942, and returned with the Miami Seahawks in 1946.

See also
 List of college football yearly passing leaders

External links
Kay Eakin's page at Database Football

1917 births
1993 deaths
People from Pope County, Arkansas
Players of American football from Arkansas
American football running backs
American football punters
Arkansas Razorbacks football players
Pittsburgh Steelers players
New York Giants players
Miami Seahawks players
American football quarterbacks
United States Army personnel of World War II
United States Army soldiers